Richard Trupp (born 1973) is a British sculptor who specialises in large-scale works. He was a student of the late Sir Anthony Caro.

Early life and education

Born in Wolverhampton, Trupp grew up in Birmingham. Whilst at secondary school, Trupp won the Fletcher Award for Creative Ability and Excellence, before gaining a distinction in Foundation Studies in Art and Design at Sutton Coldfield College of Further Education (1993). Trupp studied BA Fine Art at Nottingham Trent University (1994-1997) and in 1998, achieved a distinction in MA Site Specific Sculpture at Wimbledon School of Art.

Career

In 1999, Trupp spent a year working as Sir Anthony Caro’s assistant. Under Caro's tutelage, Trupp worked on projects such as the Millennium Bridge, London and sculptures for the National Gallery ‘Encounters’ exhibition. Trupp’s MA show entitled ‘Fixing Blocks’ was held at the Royal British Society of Sculptors in 2000, where he was awarded full membership to the Royal British Society of Sculptors. In 2002, Trupp become the first Artist in Residence at Metal, West Hampstead. In the same year, Trupp began working at Arch Bronze, a foundry in Putney, London. Here he worked on bronze sculptures by artists such as Marc Quinn, The Chapman Brothers, Gavin Turk, Eduardo Paolozzi and Rebecca Warren.

Sculpture
Often working in steel, Trupp’s work possesses an industrial quality that has been accounted to a childhood growing up in Birmingham. As described in the Jerwood Sculpture Prize catalogue:

"Trupp has been strongly influenced by a city that once rejoiced in the sobriquet 'the workshop of the world.'   relishes the monumental ironworks still surviving there, and relates his own attitude as a sculptor to the 'hands-on' attitude still found in this 'city of makers'."

Whilst creating innovative and bold sculpture, Trupp’s work is equally 'grounded in a deep respect for the history of sculpture and a curiosity about the myths that have grown up around it.' 

The Juggernaut of Nought installed outside Nottingham Trent's Arkwright Building is a tribute to his mentor Anthony Caro.

Awards

In 2001, Trupp was awarded the Stanley Picker Fellowship for Sculpture by The Stanley Picker Gallery, Kingston upon Thames. Whilst completing the Stanley Picker Fellowship, Trupp was shortlisted for the inaugural national Jerwood Sculpture Prize, which resulted in a touring exhibition of Edinburgh, Birmingham and the Jerwood Space, London.

Teaching

In 2003, Trupp was employed as a Specialist Practitioner at Kingston University, a position he still currently holds. In 2005 he established a Bronze Casting Foundry at Kingston University and received a research grant from the University to visit the British School in Rome. He is the University's Senior Lecturer in bronze casting and won the University's Enterprise Award for bronze casting in June 2007.

References

External links
 

British sculptors
British male sculptors
1973 births
Living people